The North Bačka District is one of seven administrative districts of the autonomous province of Vojvodina, Serbia. It lies in the Bačka geographical region. According to the 2011 census results, it has a population of 186,906 inhabitants. The administrative center of the district is the city of Subotica.

Administrative history
In the 9th century, the area was ruled by the Bulgarian-Slavic duke Salan. From 11th to 16th century, during the administration of the medieval Kingdom of Hungary, the area was divided between the Bodrogiensis County, Bacsensis County, Csongradiensis County, and Cumania region. In 1526-1527, the area was ruled by the independent Serb ruler, emperor Jovan Nenad, while during Ottoman administration (16th-17th century), it was part of the Sanjak of Segedin.

During Habsburg administration (18th century), the area was divided between the Military Frontier and the Batsch County. The Batsch County was joined with Bodrog County into single Batsch-Bodrog County in the 18th century. Since the abolishment of the Theiß-Marosch section of the Military Frontier in 1751, part of that territory was also included into Batsch-Bodrog County. In the 1850s, the area was part of the Sombor District, and after 1860, it was again included into Batsch-Bodrog County.

During the royal Serb-Croat-Slovene (Yugoslav) administration (1918-1941), the area was part of the Novi Sad County (1918-1922), Bačka Oblast (1922-1929), and Danube Banovina (1929-1941).

During the Hungarian-German Axis occupation (1941-1944), the area was included into Bács-Bodrog County. Since 1944, the area was part of autonomous Yugoslav Vojvodina (which was part of new socialist Yugoslav Serbia since 1945). The present-day districts of Serbia (including North Bačka District) were defined by the Government of Serbia's Enactment of 29 January 1992.

Municipalities
The North Bačka District comprises three municipalities and 45 local communities. The municipalities are:
 Subotica (Hungarian: Szabadka)
 Bačka Topola (Hungarian: Topolya)
 Mali Iđoš (Hungarian: Kishegyes)

Demographics

According to the last official census done in 2011, the North Bačka District has 186,906 inhabitants.

Ethnic groups
The population of the district is ethnically mixed.

Languages
Languages spoken in the district (2002 census): 
Hungarian = 88,464 (44.20%)
Serbian = 88,323 (44.13%) (*)
Croatian = 9,106 (4.55%) (*)
Other.

(*) Total number of speakers of South Slavic languages (Serbian and Croatian) that live in the district is 97,429 (48.68%).

Religion
Religion (2002 census):
Roman Catholic = 117,456 (58.69%)
Orthodox = 55,028 (27.50%)
Protestant = 9,844 (4.92%)
Other.

Municipalities and local communities
As of 2002, two municipalities have a Hungarian ethnic majority: Bačka Topola (58.94%) and Mali Iđoš (55.92%), while one municipality (Subotica) is ethnically mixed. The population of Subotica is composed of: Hungarians (38.47%), Serbs (24.14%), Croats (11.24%), Bunjevci (10.95%), Yugoslavs (5.76%), Montenegrins (1.25%), and others.

As for local communities, 20 have a Hungarian majority, 15 have a Serb majority, seven have Croatian/Bunjevci majority, one has a Montenegrin majority and two are ethnically mixed, with a Hungarian relative majority.

Culture
Subotica is a multi-ethnic and multi-religious center; in addition to the major Roman Catholic and Serbian Orthodox communities, there are nearly thirty other small-size religious communities in the town. The most remarkable religious buildings are the Cathedral of St Teresa of Avila from 1797, the Franciscan Monastery from 1723, the Orthodox Church from the 18th century, the Synagogue and Orthodox Church in Aleksandrovo, both from the 17th century.

Economy
In keeping with its very rich resources, the region's food processing industry is well developed. The best examples are  "29 November" meat industry, "Pionir" food factory and "Fidelinka" bread and flour products factory. Subotica ranks among the leading communities in Serbia when it comes to crop (maize, wheat and sunflower) yields.

See also
 Administrative divisions of Serbia
 Districts of Serbia

References

Note: All official material made by Government of Serbia is public by law. Information was taken from official website.

External links

 

 

Geography of Vojvodina
Districts of Vojvodina